Derek Blake Booth (born 7 April 1953) is an Anglo-American aristocratic academic and geologist. Booth is heir presumptive to the Booth baronetcy.

Education and career
Educated at Hampshire College, Amherst (B.A. in Literature, 1974), University of California, Berkeley (B.A. in Geology, 1978), Stanford University (M.S. in Geology, 1980) and the University of Washington (Ph.D. in Geological Sciences, 1984), Booth was Professor of Civil & Environmental Engineering and Earth & Space Sciences at the University of Washington, before joining Stillwater Sciences (Past President).

Booth, an affiliate professor of the University of Washington and an adjunct professor of the Bren School of Environmental Science & Management (UCSB), is senior editor of Quaternary Research.

Family
Of Anglo-American aristocratic descent, Booth married Elizabeth Dreisbach on 28 June 1981, and had two children, including a son, Colin Booth (born 1982), heir-in-line to the baronetcy. They divorced in 2000.

Booth married Stephanie Louise Moret on 24 June 2006 with whom he lives in Santa Barbara, California.

References

Living people
1953 births
American people of English descent
American people of British descent
Derek
Younger sons of baronets
Hampshire College alumni
University of Washington College of the Environment alumni
UC Berkeley College of Letters and Science alumni
Stanford University alumni
American geologists
People from Beverly Hills, California
People from Santa Barbara, California